Me vs. Me is the third mixtape by American rapper NLE Choppa. It was released through Warner Records on January 28, 2022. The album features guest appearances from Young Thug, Polo G, G Herbo, and Moneybagg Yo.

Background and promotion
The album was originally supposed to be released on December 17, 2021. NLE Choppa later pushed it back by four weeks to January 14, 2022, and then again by another week, January 21, 2022. On the originally planned release date, NLE Choppa was interviewed by HotNewHipHop and revealed that  Young Thug and Moneybagg Yo will both appear on the project. He commentated his opinion on it: Me vs. Me is, pretty much, a project concept I've been wanting to get out for a long time. I chose a few old songs and I chose a lot more newer songs so that people can see the growth that I've shown musically. At the same time, I'm still speaking on the same topics of what my core fans like to hear from me.

On January 20 the album release was postponed by another week. The artist said this was out of respect for the Long Live Young Dolph compilation which was released that week in honor of Young Dolph.

Singles
The mixtape’s lead single, "Final Warning", was released on April 30, 2021. The second single, "Mmm Hmm", was released on August 13, 2021. The third single, "Jumpin", which features American rapper Polo G, was released on November 5, 2021. The fourth single, "I.Y.B.", was released on November 19, 2021. The fifth single, "Drop Shit", was released on December 17, 2021. The sixth and final single, "Too Hot", which features American rapper Moneybagg Yo, was released on January 14, 2022. On January 28, 2022, the same day the mixtape released, the seventh single, Shotta Flow 6, released with the music video for it.

Track listing

Charts

References

2022 mixtape albums
NLE Choppa albums
Warner Records albums
Albums produced by Quay Global
Albums produced by Taz Taylor (record producer)
Albums produced by Nick Mira